Sean Maher (born April 16, 1975) is an American actor. He is known for his portrayal of Simon Tam in the science fiction television series Firefly and follow-up movie Serenity.

Early life
Maher was born in Pleasantville, New York to Joseph and Margaret Maher. After graduating from Byram Hills High School, Maher trained at New York University where he earned his drama degree in 1997. He acted on stage in several productions, including Yerma and Into the Woods.

Career
Maher starred as the title character, a rookie police officer, on the short-lived TV series Ryan Caulfield: Year One.  In 2000 he played one of the main characters on the short-lived (dropped after seven episodes) Fox series The $treet, and he has also appeared on the television series Party of Five (as Adam Matthews) and on CSI: Miami.

He reprised his role from Firefly in the film Serenity (2005).  Maher was also cast as a chief resident in a hospital on the new series Halley's Comet.  He appeared in the 2005 Lifetime network movie The Dive From Clausen's Pier as Michelle Trachtenberg's new love interest. He also appeared as Brian Piccolo in the 2001 remake of Brian's Song.

In 2006, he appeared in the television movie Wedding Wars. After taking a brief break from acting, Maher came back to TV in 2009 as a guest star in Lifetime Television's pilot episode of Drop Dead Diva, followed by 2010 guest appearances in the second season of The Mentalist (CBS), the first season of Human Target (FOX) and the second season of Warehouse 13 (on Syfy).

In 2011 Maher landed a role in the television series The Playboy Club. He played Sean, a closeted gay man who is in a sham marriage with a closeted lesbian Playboy Bunny. He appeared in eight episodes, in 2011 and 2012, in another series, Make It or Break It, as the character Marcus. He played the villainous Don John in Joss Whedon's 2012 adaptation of Much Ado About Nothing.

In 2014, Maher starred as Dick Grayson/Nightwing in Son of Batman, a direct-to-video animated film. It is part of the DC Universe Animated Original Movies. This was followed by the same role in Justice League vs. Teen Titans and Batman: Bad Blood in 2016 and Teen Titans: The Judas Contract in 2017.

Personal life
Maher publicly came out as gay in 2011, using his role as a closeted gay man on The Playboy Club as a platform. He and his husband Paul have two adopted children: a daughter, Sophia, and a son, Liam. Following the birth of their daughter in 2007, Maher took two years off from acting to be a stay-at-home dad.

Filmography

Film

Television

Other media

References

External links

1975 births
Living people
20th-century American male actors
21st-century American male actors
Male actors from New York (state)
American male film actors
American male television actors
American male voice actors
American gay actors
LGBT people from New York (state)
Tisch School of the Arts alumni
People from Pleasantville, New York